Wang Feng (born November 14, 1985 in Ya'an, Sichuan) is a Chinese sprint canoeist who has competed since the mid-2000s. She won two medals in the K-4 1000 m event at the ICF Canoe Sprint World Championships with a silver in 2007 and a bronze in 2006.

Wang also competed in the K-2 500 m event at the 2008 Summer Olympics in Beijing, but was eliminated in the heats.

References

Sports-reference.com profile
Team China 2008 profile
Team China 2008 profile, Chinese

1985 births
Living people
Canoeists at the 2008 Summer Olympics
Olympic canoeists of China
People from Ya'an
Asian Games medalists in canoeing
Sportspeople from Sichuan
ICF Canoe Sprint World Championships medalists in kayak
Canoeists at the 2010 Asian Games
Chinese female canoeists
Medalists at the 2010 Asian Games
Asian Games gold medalists for China